Bernhard Kotynski (born 13 April 1994) is an Austrian footballer who plays for FC Blau-Weiß Linz.

External links
 
 

Austrian footballers
FC Blau-Weiß Linz players
SKN St. Pölten players
1994 births
Living people
Association football defenders
SV Neulengbach (men) players